Røldal is a former municipality in the southeastern corner of the old Hordaland county, Norway.  The  municipality existed from 1838 until 1964 and it was located in the southeastern part of the present-day Ullensvang Municipality. The administrative centre was the village of Røldal, where the Røldal Stave Church is located. The municipality encompassed the Røldalen valley and some small side valleys, as well as a large area up on the vast Hardangervidda plateau. Historically, Røldal was an important trade and transportation route between Eastern and Western Norway.

History

Historically, the Røldal area was part of the parish of Suldal (to the south), with Røldal being an annex to the main parish.  Suldal and Røldal each had their own churches, but they shared a priest since Røldal was a sparsely populated area and could not support their own priest.  Suldal was located in Stavanger county and Røldal was located in Søndre Bergenhus county.

This arrangement was not a problem until 1837 when the formannskapsdistrikt law was passed.  The law called for each parish to become a municipality led by a self-governing council. It also said that each municipality must be within one county, not two. Therefore, Suldal and Røldal had to be divided and starting on 1 January 1838, Røldal became its own municipality in Søndre Bergenhus county. During the 1960s, there were many municipal mergers across Norway due to the work of the Schei Committee. The sparsely-populated municipality existed until 1 January 1964 when Røldal (population: 676) was merged into the larger neighboring municipality of Odda (population: 9,487).

Municipal council
The municipal council  of Kinsarvik is made up of 13 representatives that were elected to four year terms.  The party breakdown of the final municipal council was as follows:

Name
The municipality was named after the main village in the parish, Røldal.  The village in turn was named after the valley in which it is located.  The Old Norse form of the name might have been Rœrgudalr.  The first element would then be the genitive case of the local rivername Røyrga (derived from røyrr which means 'rocky ground') and the last element is dalr which means 'dale' or 'valley'.

References

Odda
Former municipalities of Norway